Heather Watson was the defending champion but chose not to participate.

Tatjana Maria won the title, defeating Louisa Chirico in the final, 6–2, 6–0.

Seeds

Main draw

Finals

Top half

Bottom half

External Links
 Main draw

Dow Corning Tennis Classic - Singles
Dow Corning Tennis Classic